Cochetopah National Forest was established as the Cochetopah Forest Reserve in Colorado on June 13, 1905 with .  It became a National Forest on March 4, 1907. On July 1, 1908 it was renamed Cochetopa National Forest and exchanged land with Leadville National Forest, ceding land to Rio Grande National Forest and Gunnison National Forest. Its lands exist now as portions of San Isabel, Gunnison and Rio Grande National Forests.

References

External links
Forest History Society
Listing of the National Forests of the United States and Their Dates (from Forest History Society website) Text from Davis, Richard C., ed. Encyclopedia of American Forest and Conservation History. New York: Macmillan Publishing Company for the Forest History Society, 1983. Vol. II, pp. 743-788.

Former National Forests of Colorado
1907 establishments in Colorado